Lawn bowls at the 2018 Commonwealth Games was held at the Broadbeach Bowls Club in the Gold Coast, Australia from April 5 to 13.

Lawn bowls is one of ten core sports at the Commonwealth Games and has been continuously held at every Games since the 1930 British Empire Games, with the exception of the 1966 British Empire and Commonwealth Games in Kingston, Jamaica. A total of four events per gender were contested, along with two open para-sport events, which meant a total of ten medal events were contested.

Schedule
The following is the Lawn bowls schedule:

Medal table

Medallists

Men

Women

Para-sport

Participating nations
There are 28 participating nations in the lawn bowls with a total of 240 athletes. The number of athletes a nation entered is in parentheses beside the name of the country.

See also
List of Commonwealth Games medallists in lawn bowls
Lawn bowls at the Commonwealth Games

References

External links
 Results Book – Lawn Bowls

 
2018 Commonwealth Games events
2018
2018 in bowls
Bowls in Australia
Parasports competitions